Al-Safi is a sub-district located in Al Makhadir District, Ibb Governorate, Yemen. Al-Safi had a population of  5868 as of 2004.

References 

Sub-districts in Al Makhadir District